Chester William New, FRSC (9 October 1882 – 31 August 1960) was a Canadian historian, known for his biographies of Lord Durham and Henry Brougham.

New was educated at the University of Toronto, McMaster University, and the University of Chicago, having also been ordained a Baptist minister before his graduate studies. He taught at Brandon College from 1913 and McMaster University from 1920 to 1950, where he was Professor of History and sometime head of the Department of History.

Elected a fellow of the Royal Society of Canada in 1937, New was President of the Canadian Historical Association from 1936 to 1937.

He was the Progressive Conservative candidate for Hamilton West in the 1945 Canadian federal election.

References 

1882 births
1960 deaths
20th-century Canadian historians
Canadian biographers
University of Toronto alumni
McMaster University alumni
University of Chicago alumni
Academic staff of Brandon University
Academic staff of McMaster University
Fellows of the Royal Society of Canada
Presidents of the Canadian Historical Association
Canadian Baptist ministers
Progressive Conservative Party of Canada candidates for the Canadian House of Commons